Northallerton railway station is on the East Coast Main Line serving the town of Northallerton in North Yorkshire, England. Its three-letter station code is NTR.

The station is managed by TransPennine Express (TPE) and also served by Grand Central (GC) and London North Eastern Railway (LNER) trains. The station is on one of the fastest parts of the East Coast Main Line.

History

The station was opened by the Great North of England Railway on 30 March 1841. Eleven years later the Leeds Northern Railway's line from Leeds to Stockton passed through the town, but did not initially connect with the main line. Instead trains called at nearby Northallerton Town station near where it passed beneath the line to Darlington. By 1854 the GNoE and the LN had become part of the North Eastern Railway which began running through trains on the LN route via Thirsk. These rejoined the line towards Eaglescliffe on a new link from the main line at High Junction that opened in 1856. The original LN route southwards towards Melmerby was then operated as a branch line until 1901, when the NER connected it to the main line via another junction at the southern end of the station and used it as the primary route from West Yorkshire to Teesside.

It joined the main line immediately north of the station and its trains used a bay at the northern end of the northbound island platform. The old down passenger loop platform and Hawes bay were removed in the early 1970s and  there is no direct route to the branch from the station as its junction faces north; trains must access it by means of a reversing siding off the northbound main line. The defunct south to west curve will need to be reinstated and a new platform constructed before Wensleydale trains can run to and from the station. The link to Leeming Bar was by bus until late 2014 until a temporary terminus was constructed approximately one mile (1.6 km) away.

Services were withdrawn on the line towards Ripon on 6 March 1967, after the route was earmarked for closure in the Beeching Report. The line north-eastwards towards Stockton had lost its local passenger services by this time, but it was retained for freight traffic to and from Teesside and occasional longer distance passenger trains.  It now carries a regular service to and from Middlesbrough.

Future
In plans published in 2020, Network Rail unveiled a proposal to provide two fast lines through the station and to move both platforms outwards with new loops. There are other possible variations including the installation of a grade-separated junction north of the station, to allow trains to access the Middlesbrough line without conflicting with trains heading south, and even a proposal to move the station south of the town so that it can be furnished with platforms that have access to all lines.

Facilities
The station is staffed, its ticket hall opens from 05:30 each day (except Sundays, when it opens at 08:45) until 20:00. Self-service ticket machines are available for the collecting advance purchase/pre-paid tickets. Toilets and a newsagents are provided on the concourse, along with heated waiting rooms on both platforms. Train running information is offered via digital CIS displays, timetable posters, customer help points and automated announcements.

The station has step-free access to both platforms via ramps from a subway, however, some wheelchair users have struggled with the steepness of the ramps. In May 2021, work began on a project to replace the ramps with lifts to improve accessibility. The project was completed at the end of March 2022.

Services
TransPennine Express is the main train operator at the station: on weekdays and Saturdays the company serves Northallerton with three trains an hour each way.

In February 2017, the platforms were extended to accommodate Azuma trains which are longer than the East Coast electrics.

All Grand Central services between London King's Cross and  stop at Northallerton (five services per day each way).

CrossCountry services between Newcastle, Birmingham and beyond pass through but do not call at the station.

Electrification
Electrification of the railway through the station was carried out by British Rail, with completion by 1991.

Accidents and incidents
On 29 November 1979, a Kings Cross to Edinburgh Service (1S28) was derailed just south of the station. Although the complement of passengers was in excess of 440, only one person was kept in hospital overnight. The leading power car of the High Speed Train (E43110) had a seized front axle because of a gearbox failure and confusion over maintenance schedules and it caused an out of gauge wheelset that derailed on the points.

Ripon Railway

The city was previously served by Ripon railway station on the Leeds–Northallerton line that ran between Leeds and Northallerton. It was once part of the North Eastern Railway and then LNER.

The Ripon line was closed to passengers on 6 March 1967 and to freight on 5 September 1969 as part of the wider Beeching Axe, despite a vigorous campaign by local campaigners, including the city's MP. Today much of the route of the line through the city is now a relief road and although the former station still stands, it is now surrounded by a new housing development. The issue remains a significant one in local politics and there are movements wanting to restore the line. Reports suggest the reopening of a line between Ripon railway station and Harrogate railway station would be economically viable, costing £40 million and could initially attract 1,200 passengers a day, rising to 2,700. Campaigners call on MPs to restore Ripon railway link.

See also
Railways in Northallerton

References

Sources

External links
 
 

Railway stations in North Yorkshire
DfT Category D stations
Former North Eastern Railway (UK) stations
Railway stations in Great Britain opened in 1841
Railway stations served by Grand Central Railway
Railway stations served by TransPennine Express
Railway stations served by London North Eastern Railway
Northallerton